Cydnidae are a family of pentatomoid bugs, known by common names including burrowing bugs or burrower bugs. As the common name would suggest, many members of the group live a subterranean lifestyle, burrowing into soil using their head and forelegs, only emerging to mate and then laying their eggs in soil. Other members of the group are not burrowers, and live above the soil layer, often in close association with plants. Several species are known as agricultural pests.

Description 
Burrowing bugs range from 2 to 20 mm in length. They are dark, ovoid in shape and highly sclerotised. The head is generally subquadrate to semicircular in shape, and has a pair of 5-segmented antennae. The coxae of the legs have setal combs, while the apices of the mid and hind coxae are fringed with rigid setae. The tibiae of the legs (also often the head and pronotum) have spines. The tarsi of the legs are 3-segmented and often reduced.

Similar to other pentatomoids, Cydnidae have glands in the thorax (adults) or the lateral part of the abdomen (nymphs) that secrete a foul-smelling mix of chemicals for defense against predators.

Though similar in appearance to a beetle at casual glance, they can be distinguished by both their piercing/sucking mouthparts, and wing configuration (beetle elytra are split directly down the back of the insect).

Ecology 
Cydnidae in subfamilies Cydninae and Cephalocteinae live mostly in soil and feed on roots of plants. Those in subfamilies Parastrachinae, Sehirinae and Thyreocorinae instead live on aboveground parts of plants. Adults are attracted to light and sometimes in large numbers.

Cydnidae feed on sap from phloem, unlike other heteropterans.

Importance 
As of 2003, there were 27 cydnid species reported as crop pests and six that feed on peanut. Of the peanut-feeding species, Pangaeus bilineatus is the most abundant and the only one associated with feeding injury to peanut kernels.

Another pest is Fromundus pygmaeus, which attacks rice seedlings, sugarcane, fallen seeds of grasses and roots of soybean and clover.

Some cydnids are medically important. The aforementioned F. pygmaeus facultatively sucks blood from humans, while Chilocoris assmuthi can cause brown lesions on skin (usually on the feet) with its defensive secretions.

Subfamilies and taxonomy
BioLib includes the following subfamilies:
Amnestinae 
 †Acanthamnestus  Burmese Amber, Myanmar, mid Cretaceous (latest Albian-earliest Cenomanian)
 Amnestus 
 †Chilamnestocoris  Burmese Amber, Myanmar
 †Cilicydnus  Yixian Formation, China, Early Cretaceous (Aptian) 
 Lattinestus 
 †Latiscutella  Crato Formation, Codo Formation, Brazil, Aptian
 †Orienicydnus  Yixian Formation, China
 †Pricecoris  Codo Formation, Brazil
 †Punctacorona  Burmese Amber, Myanmar
 Cephalocteninae 
 Cephaloctenini 
 Cephalocteus 
 Heissocteus 
 Scaptocorini 
 Afroropus 
 Atarsocoris 
 Pseudostibaropus 
 Scaptocoris 
 Schiodtella 
 Stibaropus 
 †Clavicorinae 
 †Clavicoris  Gurvan-Eren Formation, Mongolia, Aptian
 †Cretacoris  Daya Formation, Russia, Early Cretaceous, Gurvan-Eren Formation, Mongolia
 Cydninae 
 Garsauriinae 
 Garsauria 
 Garsauriella 
 Sehirinae 
 †Eocenocydnus  Bembridge Marls, United Kingdom, Eocene (Priabonian)

In some older classifications, Cydnidae sensu lato includes the subfamily Thyreocorinae (now a separate family, Thyreocoridae), which are known commonly as "negro bugs" or "ebony bugs", and/or the families Thaumastellidae and Parastrachiidae.

References

 
Heteroptera families